Algiers is the seventh studio album by indie rock americana band Calexico, released on 11 September 2012.

The album's name comes from Algiers, New Orleans, which is where the album was recorded.

Track listing
All songs written by Joey Burns & John Convertino, except "Fortune Teller" by Joey Burns & Pieta Brown, and "No Te Vayas" by Jacob Valenzuela.
In some releases a bonus disc was included, entitled "Spiritoso," which featured the band playing their songs accompanied by the Radio Symphonie Orchester Wien and the Deutsches Filmorchester Babelsberg, conducted by Cornelius Meister and Matt Dunkley respectively.

Tracks 1,8 and 11 performed with the Radio Symphonie Orchester Wien; tracks 2, 3, 4, 5, 6, 7, 9, 10 and 12 performed with the Deutsches Filmorchester Babelsberg

Personnel
Calexico
John Convertino – drums, percussion, vibraphone
Joey Burns – vocals, guitars, upright bass, piano, Vibes, Keys, Accordion

Additional musicians
Jacob Valenzuela – trumpet, vocals 
Martin Wenk – trumpet, Wurlitzer, sampled strings, accordion, theremin 
Paul Niehaus – pedal steel 
Jairo Zavala – vocals, slide guitar, bazouki, acoustic guitar, percussion 
Volker Zander – upright bass, electric bass 
Craig Schumacher – Mellotron, percussion, Wurlitzer 
Sergio Mendoza – piano 
Michael Carbajal – trumpet 
Michael Fan – violin 
Rose Todaro – violin 
Joseph Pagan – viola 
Anne Gratz – cello 
Craig Klein – trombone 
Jason Mingledorff – tenor and baritone saxophone 
Pieta Brown – backing vocals 
Tom Hagerman – violins, viola 
Chris Lopez – baritone trombone 
Chris Schultz – Moog synth for pedal steel (11)

Charts

In 2012, it was awarded a double silver certification from the Independent Music Companies Association, which indicated sales of at least 40,000 copies throughout Europe.

References

External links
 

2012 albums
Calexico (band) albums
Anti- (record label) albums